BeMusic may refer to:

 Be-Music Script, a file format for rhythm action games
 BeMusic, a name used by members of New Order when producing recordings by other bands
 BeMusic, a planned Internet music marketing brand for Bertelsmann